Piper Duck (born 2 April 2001) is an Australian rugby union player.

Biography 
Duck was selected for the Wallaroos A team and the Australian Youth Girls 7s team in 2019. She plays for Waratahs in the Super W competition and made her debut in the 2020 season against the Melbourne Rebels.

On 6 May 2022, Duck made her international debut for the Wallaroos against Fiji. She also featured in their 10–12 loss to Japan. She was named in Australia's squad for the 2022 Pacific Four Series in New Zealand.

Duck was called into the Wallaroos squad for a two-test series against the Black Ferns at the Laurie O'Reilly Cup. She was later selected in the team again for the delayed 2022 Rugby World Cup in New Zealand.

References

External links
Wallaroos Profile

Living people
Australia women's international rugby union players
Australian female rugby union players
2001 births